Wold may refer to:

Radio stations 

 WOLD-FM, an American radio station licensed to Marion, Virginia
 WOLD-LP, an American radio station licensed to Woodbridge, New Jersey
 WHNK (AM), an American radio station licensed as "WOLD" from 1962 to 2006

Places
 Wold, an Old English term for an unforested area of high ground
 The Wolds, a term used in England to describe a range of hills consisting of open country overlying limestone or chalk
 Old, Northamptonshire, a village in England, former name Wold

Other uses
 Wold (surname)
 The Wold, the northern region of Rohan, in J. R. R. Tolkien's Middle-earth legendarium
 "WOLD" (song), a hit single by Harry Chapin

See also
 Weald, an area of South East England between the parallel chalk escarpments of the North and the South Downs
 Wood
 Wald (disambiguation)
 Wold's decomposition
 Wold's theorem
 Cramér–Wold theorem
 Wold Newton family, a fictional creation of Philip José Farmer